The Poncione di Valleggia is a mountain of the Lepontine Alps, overlooking Bedretto, in the Swiss canton of Ticino.

References

External links
 Poncione di Vallegia

Mountains of the Alps
Mountains of Switzerland
Mountains of Ticino
Lepontine Alps